Hakob Hamazaspi Manandian (November 10, 1873 - February 4, 1952) was an Armenian historian, philologist, and member of the Academy of Sciences of Armenia (1943) and the Academy of Sciences of the USSR (1939).

His most important work is A Critical Survey of the History of the Armenian People (vols. 1–3, 1945–57). He was awarded the Order of the Red Banner of Labour.

Biography

Manandian was born on November 22, 1873, in Akhaltsikhe. From 1880 to 1883 he received his primary education at the Karapetyan College in his hometown. From 1883 to 1893 he studied at the First Gymnasium in Tiflis, and from 1893 to 1897 attended universities in Jena, Leipzig and Strasbourg, completing his PhD degree. In 1898 he graduated from the Faculty of Oriental Languages of the University of St. Petersburg, and in 1909 from the Faculty of Law of the University of Dorpat (now Tartu). From 1900 to 1905 Manandian taught at the Gevorgian Seminary of Ejmiatsin, from 1905 to 1907 at the First and Second Men's Gymnasiums in Tiflis, from 1906 to 1907 at the Nersisian School, from 1911 to 1913 at the People's University of Baku, and from 1915 to 1919 at a mercantile school. 

In December 1919 Manandian was invited to Yerevan State University (YSU) and appointed acting dean of the Faculty of History and Linguistics. From 1921 to 1922 he was rector at YSU. From 1922 to 1923 he was the dean of the faculties of Art and Historiography, from 1921 to 1925 the head of the chair of the History of the Armenian People and professor of the same chair.

In 1925 Manandian was awarded the title of professor. In 1938, he attained his title of Doctor of Historical Sciences. 

In 1925 he was elected a member of the Institute of Sciences and Arts of Armenia, in 1939 he became a member of the Academy of Sciences of the USSR, and in 1943 his candidacy was approved as a founding member of the Academy of Sciences of the USSR. He was the first to teach ancient and medieval history of the Armenian people at YSU. In 1931 he interrupted his pedagogical activities and engaged in scientific work. He died on February 4, 1952, in Yerevan. His ashes are interred at the Pantheon at Komitas Park.

A monument is erected in front of building No. 62 on Teryan Street in Yerevan. His bronze bust is placed in the lobby of the YSU main building. A street is named after him in the Shengavit district of Yerevan.

Works

References

1873 births
1952 deaths
People from Akhaltsikhe
Georgian people of Armenian descent
Armenian people from the Russian Empire
Soviet Armenians
19th-century philologists
Full Members of the USSR Academy of Sciences
Ethnic Armenian historians
20th-century historians from Georgia (country)
Burials at the Komitas Pantheon
Soviet historians